Petr Gandalovič (born 15 August 1964) is a Czech politician and one of the founding members of the Civic Democratic Party. He served as the Czech Ambassador to the United States from 2011 to 2017.

Education 

Gandalovič attended secondary school in Ústí nad Labem from 1978 to 1982, continuing on to the School of Mathematics and Physics at Charles University in Prague from 1982–1987. He subsequently taught in a secondary school in Ústí nad Labem until 1990.

Political career
In 1989, Gandalovič was a founder member of the Civic Forum, and was elected as a Member of the Federal Assembly in 1990. The following year he was one of the founders of the breakaway Civic Democratic Party.

In 1992 he was appointed Deputy Minister of Environment, and in 1994 he became an adviser to the Minister of Foreign Affairs. In 1997 he became the Consul General of the Czech Republic in New York City, before returning to the Czech Republic in 2002 to serve one term as the Mayor of Ústí nad Labem.

In 2006 he became Vice-chairman of the Civic Democratic Party, and served as Minister for Regional Development (2006-2007) and then Agriculture (2007-2009) under Prime Minister Mirek Topolánek.

From 2011 to 2017 he was the Czech Ambassador to the United States.

External links 
 Homepage 

1964 births
Living people
Politicians from Prague
Civic Democratic Party (Czech Republic) MPs
Agriculture ministers of the Czech Republic
Regional Development ministers of the Czech Republic
Mayors of places in the Czech Republic
Ambassadors of the Czech Republic to the United States
Civic Democratic Party (Czech Republic) Government ministers
Civic Democratic Party (Czech Republic) mayors
Young Conservatives (Czech Republic) politicians
Members of the Chamber of Deputies of the Czech Republic (2006–2010)
Members of the Chamber of Deputies of the Czech Republic (2010–2013)
Members of the Chamber of the Nations of Czechoslovakia (1990–1992)
Charles University alumni